"How Do You Do It?" is the debut single by Liverpudlian band Gerry and the Pacemakers. It was written by Mitch Murray. The song reached number one in the UK Singles Chart on 11 April 1963, where it stayed for three weeks.

History
The song was written by Mitch Murray, who offered it to Adam Faith and Brian Poole but was turned down. George Martin of EMI, feeling the song had enormous hit potential, decided to pick it up for the new group he was producing, the Beatles, as the A-side of their first single. The Beatles recorded the song on 4 September 1962 with Ringo Starr on drums. The group was initially opposed to recording it, feeling that it did not fit their sound, but worked out changes from Murray's demo-disc version. These included a new introduction, vocal harmony, an instrumental interlude, small lyric changes and removal of the half-step modulation for the last verse. Although Murray disliked their changes, the decision not to release the Beatles' version was primarily a business one, as EMI publisher Ardmore & Beechwood were interested in publishing Lennon–McCartney material, while Murray did not want his song relegated to the B-side. In fact, George Martin came very close to issuing "How Do You Do It?" as the Beatles' first single before settling instead on "Love Me Do", recorded during the same sessions. Martin commented later: "I looked very hard at 'How Do You Do It?', but in the end I went with 'Love Me Do', it was quite a good record." McCartney would remark: "We knew that the peer pressure back in Liverpool would not allow us to do 'How Do You Do It'."

The Beatles' version of "How Do You Do It?" was officially unissued for over 30 years, finally seeing release in November 1995 on the retrospective Anthology 1.

While the Beatles' recording remained in the vaults, Martin still had faith in the song's appeal. Consequently, he had another new client, Gerry and the Pacemakers, record "How Do You Do It?" as their debut single in early 1963. This version of "How Do You Do It?", produced by Ron Richards, became a number-one hit in the UK until it was replaced by "From Me to You" (the Beatles' third single). It was the title song of a 7-inch EP that also featured "Away from You", "I Like It" and "It's Happened to Me" (Columbia SEG8257, released July 1963).

Chart performance
Gerry and the Pacemakers' version of "How Do You Do It?" was initially issued in the US and Canada in the spring of 1963, but made no impact on the charts. After the group had issued several chart singles in North America, the track was reissued in the summer of 1964. "How Do You Do It?" entered the US charts on 5 July 1964, eventually reaching number nine; it did even better in Canada, peaking at number six. Billboard described the song as a "top-rated teen ballad" with a "great beat for dancing."  Cash Box described it as a "bright jumper...that's sure to get chart action right off the bat" and also as "a charming, teen-angled stomp-atwist’er...that the outfit knocks out in very commercial solo vocal and combo instrumental manner."

In their native UK, the single reached number one in the charts, staying there for three weeks in total.

References

External links
Gerry Marsden fan site
Classic Bands history page

1963 songs
1963 debut singles
Songs written by Mitch Murray
Gerry and the Pacemakers songs
The Beatles songs
Dick and Dee Dee songs
Song recordings produced by George Martin
UK Singles Chart number-one singles
Columbia Graphophone Company singles